Hersee is a surname. Notable people with the surname include:

Carole Hersee (born 1958), English costume designer
Dustin Hersee (born 1975), Canadian swimmer 
George Hersee (1924–2001), English television engineer
Malcolm Hersee (1864–1922), Bangor F.C. and Wales international football goalkeeper
Richard Hersee (1867–1922), Llandudno Swifts F.C. and Wales international footballer
Rose Hersee (1845–1924), English operatic soprano